Andrey Golubev and Aleksandr Nedovyesov were the defending champions but chose not to defend their title.

Hsu Yu-hsiou and Benjamin Lock won the title after defeating Peter Polansky and Sergiy Stakhovsky 2–6, 6–1, [10–7] in the final.

Seeds

Draw

References

External links
 Main draw

President's Cup - Men's Doubles
2021 Men's Doubles